Lee Jae-hak (Hangul: 이재학, Hanja: 李在學; born October 4, 1990 in Daegu, South Korea) is a starting pitcher playing for the NC Dinos of the KBO League. He bats and throws right-handed.

Amateur career
Lee attended Daegu High School from 2006 to 2009. In 2008, Lee led the school to its first-ever Phoenix Flag National Championship, the most prestigious national high school competition in South Korea. As a starting pitcher he earned Best Pitcher honors for the tourney as well. Lee helped his team win another major national tournament Blue Dragon Flag National Championship, and finished the 2008 season with a 0.94 ERA in  innings pitched.

In 2009 Lee posted a 1.35 ERA in  innings pitched. Although Daegu High School failed to make the finals in the national tournaments during the 2009 season, his high K/9 rate (10.97) subsequently drew the attention of KBO scouts.

Professional career
In the 2010 KBO Draft, Lee was selected by the Doosan Bears as the tenth overall pick. Lee made his pro league debut against the LG Twins on June 15, 2010, coming on in relief, and earned his first KBO league win, hurling  scoreless innings. Lee struggled with his command through the 2010 season, however, posting a 5.01 ERA in  innings pitched as a relief pitcher.

Lee was sidelined with elbow injuries during the entire 2011 season. After the season, he was traded to the NC Dinos in the 2012 KBO Expansion Draft.

In 2012, Lee started his first season with the Dinos in the Futures League. During the 2012 season in the Futures League, he showed enough promise to be placed on the Dinos' starting rotation for their inaugural 2013 season, going 15–2 with a 1.55 ERA and 100 strikeouts.

Lee spent the Dinos' inaugural 2013 KBO campaign as a solid part of the starting rotation, alongside former MLB pitchers Charlie Shirek, Adam Wilk and Eric Hacker. Lee pitched his first complete game, a two-hit shutout, on July 31, 2013, against the SK Wyverns.

External links 
 Korea Baseball Organization career statistics at Koreabaseball.com 

NC Dinos players
Doosan Bears players
KBO League pitchers
South Korean baseball players
Sportspeople from Daegu
Living people
1990 births
Asian Games medalists in baseball
Baseball players at the 2014 Asian Games
Medalists at the 2014 Asian Games
Asian Games gold medalists for South Korea